Hempfield Park is a community-level park and recreation complex in the northern portion of Hempfield Township, Westmoreland County, PA. The park is located about four miles north of the city of Greensburg, PA, just off Business Route 66.

Facilities 
Hempfield Park is complete with the following facilities:

 One-mile walking track
 Lighted tennis courts
 Volleyball courts and horseshoe pits
 Soccer and Baseball fields
 Play Equipment
 Bocce Court
 Five Pavilions are available for rent.

Park governance 
A seven-member Parks and Recreation Commission governs administration and improvement at the park; each member serves a 5-year term on the commission. The Hempfield Township Board of Supervisors appoints members. The commission meets monthly at the Hempfield Township Municipal Building.

Athletic complex 
Located on park property, the Hempfield Township Athletic Complex (HTAC) offers indoor recreation year-round with the following facilities:

 Multi-Purpose Courts
 Fitness Track
 Concession Stand

Recreation program 
Hempfield Park is the focal point of the township's recreation program. several activities vary from season to season for all age groups. One core value of the Hempfield Recreation Program is that every participant is a player.

References 

Parks in Westmoreland County, Pennsylvania